Peginterferon beta-1a, sold under the brand name Plegridy', is medication used to treat multiple sclerosis.

The most common side effects include headache, muscle pain, joint pain, influenza (flu)-like symptoms, pyrexia (fever), chills, asthenia (weakness), and erythema (reddening of the skin), pain or pruritus (itching) at the injection site.

Peginterferon beta-1a was approved for medical use in the United States and in the European Union in 2014.

Medical uses 
In the United States peginterferon beta-1a is indicated for the treatment of relapsing forms of multiple sclerosis (MS), to include clinically isolated syndrome, relapsing-remitting disease, and active secondary progressive disease, in adults.

In the European Union peginterferon beta-1a is indicated for the treatment of relapsing remitting multiple sclerosis in adults.

References

External links 
 
 

Antineoplastic and immunomodulating drugs
Multiple sclerosis